Patrick Kamgaing (born 11 November 1990) is a Cameroonian football midfielder.

Club career
Born in Douala, he played in Qatar with Al-Mu'aidar Sports Club between 2008 and 2011. In summer 2011 he moved to Algeria and joined the, back then championship title holders, ASO Chlef, having played in the 2011–12 Algerian Ligue Professionnelle 1 and finished 5th at the end of the season.  He played in the 2012 CAF Champions League and played the first half of the 2012–13 season, but during the winter break he moved to Serbia and joined a top tier club FK Javor Ivanjica.  After a successful trial, he signed with Javor a two-year contract which expired in January 2015.  He made his debut with Javor in the 2012–13 Serbian SuperLiga on March 2, 2013, in a home match against FK Smederevo which finished with Javor victory by 4-0.

In 2014, he played with Omanian club Majees SC. In February 2015 he signed with Turkish club Erdekspor coming from Javor Ivanjica. Then he stayed in Turkey where he played with Çanakkalespor and Ortaca Belediyespor.

National team
Patrick Kamgaing was part of Cameroon team at the qualifications and in the final phase of the 2011 All-Africa Games having won the silver medal after losing in the final against Ghana by 0-1.

References

1990 births
Living people
Footballers from Douala
Cameroonian footballers
Cameroonian expatriate footballers
Association football midfielders
Muaither SC players
Expatriate footballers in Qatar
ASO Chlef players
Expatriate footballers in Algeria
FK Javor Ivanjica players
Serbian SuperLiga players
Expatriate footballers in Serbia
Qatari Second Division players
Majees SC players
Expatriate footballers in Oman
Expatriate footballers in Turkey